Juan de Alcega was a 16th-century tailor and mathematician from Basque country, Spain.

Life and work 
Little is known about the life of Juan de Alcega. He was born in the province of Gipuzkoa, probably in the town of Hondarribia. 

In 1580 he published in Madrid the book entitled Libro de Geometría, practica, y traça (Book on Geometry, Practice, and Pattern), reedited in 1589. This book is a clear example of the application of mathematics to technology in its first modern states. It was also the subject of studies on philology by his terminology and by his exposition of the mode of his times. In the introduction to his book, he states that he had some difficulties publishing it due to the resistance of the medieval guild of tailors, who thought that he was revealing the secrets of his art.

References

Bibliography

External links 
 

16th-century Spanish people
16th-century Spanish mathematicians
People from Hondarribia
Spanish tailors
Basque academics